The sculptures in the Schönbrunn Garden at Schönbrunn Palace in Vienna, Austria were created between 1773 and 1780 under the direction of Johann Wilhelm Beyer, a German artist and garden designer. The Great Parterre of Schönbrunn Garden is lined on both sides with 32 over life-size sculptures that represent mythological deities and virtues. The Neptune Fountain at the foot of the Gloriette hill is the crowning monument of the Great Parterre. Other sculptures are distributed throughout the garden and palace forecourt, including fountains and pools. Several sculptors were employed during the execution of these works, among them Johann Baptist Hagenauer.

Great Parterre

Neptune Fountain

The Neptune Fountain at the foot of the Gloriette hill was designed to be the crowning monument of the Great Parterre. Commissioned by Empress Maria Theresa, work on the fountain began in 1776 and was completed within four years, just prior to the death of the empress. The overall design was done by Johann Ferdinand Hetzendorf von Hohenberg; the marble sculptural group was executed by Wilhelm Beyer.

The retaining wall of the Neptune Fountain merges into the slope of the Gloriette hill and includes a balustrade adorned with ornate vases. From a projecting semi-oval plinth, a rocky formation emerges with the sea-god Neptune and his entourage. The plinth is segmented by panels decorated with masks and separated and embellished with garlands. Neptune stands atop the grotto at the center of the figure group in a shell-shaped chariot holding a trident. A nymph is seated to his left. The sea-goddess Thetis kneels to his right, asking the sea god to favor her son Achilles on his voyage to Troy.

Appearing at the base of the grotto are four tritons—creatures who are half-man and half-fish—who are part of the sea-god's entourage. Each holds a conch shell trumpet with which they can inspire fear. They are restraining the sea-horses who draw Neptune's chariot across the seas. This image of Neptune commanding the watery dominion was a common symbol in sixteenth, seventeenth, and eighteenth-century art, to represent monarchs controlling the fate of their people. In the nineteenth century, a bank of evergreen trees was planted behind the white figural group to provide a dark contrast.

Other sculptures

Locations

See also

 Culture of Austria
 List of gardens
 List of statues

References
Notes

Bibliography

External links
 Schloß Schönbrunn

Sculptures
Sculptures
Gardens in Austria
Outdoor sculptures in Austria
Schönbrunn Palace
Sculptures in Austria
Vienna culture